Gonzalo Andrés Garrido Zenteno (born 2 September 1973) is a Chilean road bicycle racer. He competed at the 2012 Summer Olympics in the Men's road race. He is a five-time National Champion.

Major results

1997
 3rd Road race, National Road Championships
1999
 3rd Road race, National Road Championships
2000
 2nd Road race, National Road Championships
2003
 1st  Road race, National Road Championships
2004
 3rd Road race, National Road Championships
2006
 1st  Road race, National Road Championships
2007
 1st  Road race, National Road Championships
2008
 2nd Road race, National Road Championships
 4th Road race, Pan American Road Championships
2011
 National Road Championships
1st  Road race
1st  Time trial
 1st Overall Vuelta Ciclista de Chile
 2nd  Road race, Pan American Road Championships
 8th Overall Volta Ciclística Internacional de Gravatai
2012
 1st Stage 1 Vuelta Ciclista a Costa Rica
 3rd Overall Vuelta Ciclista de Chile
1st Mountains classification
1st Stage 1
2015
 2nd Road race, National Road Championships
2016
 7th Road race, Pan American Road Championships
2017
 2nd Road race, National Road Championships

References

External links

Chilean male cyclists
Living people
Olympic cyclists of Chile
Cyclists at the 2008 Summer Olympics
Cyclists at the 2012 Summer Olympics
Sportspeople from Concepción, Chile
1973 births
Cyclists at the 2015 Pan American Games
South American Games gold medalists for Chile
South American Games medalists in cycling
Competitors at the 2014 South American Games
Pan American Games competitors for Chile
People from Concepción, Chile
21st-century Chilean people